Cleo is a 21st-century theatrical play by Lawrence Wright based on the filming of the 1963 movie "Cleopatra" during which Elizabeth Taylor and Richard Burton participated. The play focuses on their relationship.

It has been represented by English actor Richard Short as Burton portraying Mark Anthony, and by Lisa Birnbaum as Taylor portraying Cleopatra.

Cleo premiered in April 2018 at the Alley Theatre in Houston, Texas, and was directed by Bob Balaban.

References

External links 
"Cleo" at The Alley Theatre April 6-April 29, 2019 . Retrieved September 14, 2019.
Fierberg, Ruthie; Playbill "Richard Short Proves His Theatre Credentials", March 26, 2018. Retrieved September 14, 2019.

Cultural depictions of Elizabeth Taylor
Cultural depictions of Richard Burton
2018 plays
Historical romance plays
Works based on Antony and Cleopatra
Cultural depictions of actors
Plays set in the 1960s